Ternstroemia corneri is a species of tree in the family Pentaphylacaceae. It is endemic to Peninsular Malaysia, where it occurs in Johor. It grows in lowland swamp forests.

References

corneri
Endemic flora of Peninsular Malaysia
Trees of Peninsular Malaysia
Vulnerable plants
Taxonomy articles created by Polbot